The 4th arrondissement may refer to:
France
4th arrondissement of Lyon
4th arrondissement of Marseille
4th arrondissement of Paris
Benin
4th arrondissement of Porto-Novo
4th arrondissement of the Littoral Department

Arrondissement name disambiguation pages